Mexborough is a town in the City of Doncaster in South Yorkshire, England. Situated between Manvers and Denaby Main, it lies on the River Don close to where it joins the River Dearne, and the A6023 road runs through the town. It is contiguous with the town of Swinton which is directly to the southwest immediately across the railway and Conisbrough to the east. 

Historically part of the West Riding of Yorkshire, Mexborough has a population of 14,750, increasing to a ward population of 15,244 at the 2011 Census.

History
The name Mexborough combines the Old English suffix burh, meaning a fortified place, with an Old English or Old Norse personal name, which may be Meke, Muik, Meoc or Mjukr.

Mexborough is located at the north-eastern end of a dyke known as the Roman Ridge, which is thought to have been constructed either by the Brigantian tribes in the 1st century AD, perhaps as a defence against the Roman invasion of Britain, or after the 5th century to defend the British kingdom of Elmet from the Angles.

The earliest known written reference to Mexborough is found in the Domesday Book of 1086 (Mechesburg), which states that before the Norman Conquest of England the area had been controlled by the Saxon lords Wulfheah and Ulfkil. Following the Conquest, the area fell under the control of the Norman Baron Roger de Busli. The remains of an earthwork in Castle Park are thought to have been a motte-and-bailey castle constructed in the 11th century shortly after the Conquest.

St John the Baptist C of E church includes elements that date from the 12th century. A few other pre-1800 buildings remain, including several public houses: the Ferryboat Inn, the George and Dragon, the Bull's Head and the Red Lion. Most of the buildings in the town are post-1800.

Throughout the 18th, 19th and much of the 20th century the town's economy was based around coal mining, quarrying, brickworks and the production of ceramics, and it soon became a busy railway junction. These industries led to an increase in industrial illness and an increase in the mortality rate. Although the town boasted a cottage hospital, the lack of suitable facilities led to Lord Montagu donating land for a new hospital to be built. Lord Montagu laid the first stone at the site in 1904. The site is still a working hospital, which now forms part of the Doncaster and Bassetlaw NHS trust.

The industries that led to the creation of Montagu Hospital not only brought problems to the town but also led to an increase in population and, for some, an increase in wealth and opportunity. Many more public houses and other businesses were created, many of which are still trading today. It was in one of these public houses, the Montagu Arms, that Stan Laurel stayed overnight after performing at the town's Prince of Wales Theatre on 9 December 1907.

During the second half of the 19th century, as in many other industrial towns, a Cooperative Society was formed in Mexborough. It was modelled on the consumer cooperative set up by the Rochdale Pioneers in 1844. In 1861, nine working men met at the home of James Simpson in Mexborough and decided to form the Mexborough Working Men's Industrial Society (later renamed the Mexborough Cooperative Society). The aim of the Society was to supply (at first to the nine men themselves) the necessary things of life. Membership quickly grew and by the 1890s it stood at 1,200. At one time, there were ten shops across the built-up area of Mexborough. By 1903, land had been purchased in the middle of Mexborough on which to build a large and grand new central store, but then suddenly in 1904 the Mexborough Cooperative Society went into liquidation. Soon afterwards it was taken over by the Barnsley British Co-operative Society. One of Mexborough's landmarks is closely associated with the Cooperative Society. This is the former Barnsley British Cooperative Society flour mill, which stands on the north side of the River Don Navigation close to the Church of St John the Baptist. It started off as the "Don Roller Mills". It was owned by James White, who sold it to the Barnsley British Cooperative Society in 1912.

For more than a hundred years the railway locomotive maintenance and stabling depot (colloquially known as "Mexborough Loco") was a major employer. The South Yorkshire, Doncaster and Goole Railway arrived in Mexborough in 1850. The extensive coal traffic generated by the local collieries required railway locomotives to haul it and these locomotives required driving, firing, refuelling, maintenance and stabling. Mexborough was chosen as the site for a large 15-road depot. In its heyday it had an allocation of about 150 locomotives. In the 1920s it was the stabling point for the LNER Garratt, then the most powerful locomotive in the UK. The depot closed in 1964. Following the demise of coal-mining in the 1980s, Mexborough, like many ex-mining towns and villages, is still in the process of economic and social recovery.

The history of the town is charted on the Mexborough & District Heritage Society's extensive website:

Ceramics
The Rock Pottery, it is believed, traded during its early years as Beevers & Ford. In 1839, it was purchased by James Reed, who was succeeded ten years later by his son John, who changed the name of the business to the "Mexborough Pottery", and the pottery was extended and more kilns constructed. When the Rockingham Pottery closed, John Reed bought most of its moulds and produced many items from them but with differing transfer prints and also plain green with raised leaf design impressed simply with "Reed".

Politics
Before 2010, Mexborough was in the Barnsley East and Mexborough constituency. Since then, it has been in the Doncaster North constituency, whose current MP is Ed Miliband, former leader of the Labour Party.

Local party Mexborough First currently holds all three seats in the Mexborough ward on Doncaster Metropolitan Borough Council.

Transport

Rail

Mexborough railway station is located on the south bank of the River Don on Station Road, a short cul-de-sac off the A6023 Greens Way dual carriageway on the south side of the town.

Bus

Mexborough also has a bus station in the town centre, Mexborough Interchange, operated by Travel South Yorkshire.

The bus station consists of three stands (numbered A1–A3) located in a bus-only lay-by on the northern side of the eastbound carriageway of Greens Way, a single stand (numbered B1) at a right angle to these accessed from John Street, and three stands (numbered HS1–HS3) situated a short distance away at the side of Hartley Street. The three sets of stands are in close proximity, linked by car parks and pathways. The majority of bus routes traverse Mexborough town centre on a one-way loop, with the Greens Way stops serving routes heading generally eastbound towards Doncaster and the Hartley Street stops serving westbound services towards Barnsley and Rotherham.

Mexborough Interchange was built by the South Yorkshire Passenger Transport Executive in the early 1990s, replacing bus stops in both directions on the High Street which was subsequently pedestrianised. When the Interchange first opened, there was a staffed ticket office and indoor waiting area with toilet facilities located in a small building between the Greens Way stands and John Street. However, around the time of the beginning of the Great Recession, the staffed ticket office was closed and all facilities inside were sealed off as an austerity measure. As of early 2021, Travel South Yorkshire are still looking to dispose of the former ticket office building as evidenced by the persistent "to let" signs affixed to its exterior, although it has never yet seen any further use since closure. , the stand allocation is:

Education
Mexborough has one secondary school (Laurel Academy) and many primary schools.

Sport

Mexborough has been represented in the FA Cup by four different football teams – Mexborough Locomotive Works, Mexborough St. Johns, Mexborough West End and Mexborough Town.

The last of the four was the most prominent and won the Yorkshire Football League in 1973.

Notable people
Keith Barron – actor
Walter Bennett – footballer, Sheffield United & Bristol City
Brian Blessed – actor
Eric Brook – footballer
Sally Carman – actress
Dan Clarke – motor racing driver formerly driving for Minardi Team USA in the Champ Car World Series
Albert Fox – trade unionist
William Hackett – Royal Engineers tunneller, awarded the Victoria Cross 1916
William 'Iron' Hague – British heavyweight boxing champion 1908–11
Kenneth Haigh – actor
Mike Hawthorn – motor-racing driver and 1958 Formula 1 World Champion
Ted Hughes – Poet Laureate, 1984–98
Darren Johnson – Professional darts player
Peter Kitchen – professional footballer
Harold Massingham – poet
Ian Parks – poet
Dennis Priestley – professional darts player, twice world darts champion 1991 and 1994
Geoff Salmons, professional footballer, most notably with Sheffield United
Lionel Smith (born 23 August 1920) – professional footballer, for Mexborough Albion and Denaby United before making 162 appearances for Arsenal
Karen Walker – footballer, played for England, Doncaster Belles and Leeds United
Donald Watson – founder of The Vegan Society
John William Wall (pen name Sarban) – author whose works include the novel The Sound of His Horn and the collection Ringstones

See also
Listed buildings in Mexborough

References

 
Towns in South Yorkshire
Unparished areas in South Yorkshire
Geography of the Metropolitan Borough of Doncaster